XHMCA-FM (branded as La Reyna de las Huastecas) is a Mexican Spanish-language FM radio station in Pánuco, Veracruz.

History
XEMCA-AM 1090 received its concession on November 29, 1979. Owned by Homero Barrenechea Domínguez and later by his estate, XEMCA broadcast with 5,000 watts during the day and 500 at night.

The concession passed to Blanca Elena Anitua y Ruiz in 2001 and to the current company in 2003. XEMCA was cleared to migrate to FM in 2011.

In 2017, station group Grupo Mi Radio became known as Corporativo Radiofónico de México after it was sold by Roberto Chapa Zavala to businessman Luis Alfredo Biassi.

References

Radio stations in Veracruz